Rush Green may refer to:
Rush Green, London
Rush Green, Essex
Rush Green, East Hertfordshire
Rush Green, North Hertfordshire
Rush Green, Norfolk, a United Kingdom location
Rushgreen, a United Kingdom location in Cheshire

See also
Rushey Green (disambiguation)